William Sanger (November 12, 1873 – July 23, 1961) was a German-born and American-educated architect and artist. He was the husband of Margaret Sanger.

Early life and education 
Born in Berlin, Germany, Sanger came from a devoutly Jewish family which moved to the United States in about 1878.

He was educated in architecture from 1893–95 at The Cooper Union in New York City. He later studied architecture at Atelier Masquery and the Society Beaux-Arts Architects. Sanger was further educated in painting at the Art Students League of New York and the Artists-Artisans Institute.

Personal life and activism 
Sanger married Margaret Sanger (née Higgins) on August 18, 1902.

William Sanger was arrested for handing out a copy of Margaret Sanger's pamphlet on birth control, "Family Limitation".  In a statement before the Court of Special Sessions in New York City on September 10, 1915, William Sanger identified emotionally with his wife's work and referred to Anthony Comstock as a victim of "incurable sexophobia" who lacked "the intelligence to distinguish between pornography and scientific information."

The judge in the trial stated, "Your crime is not only a violation of the laws of man, but of the law of God as well, in your scheme to prevent motherhood ... If some persons would go around and urge Christian women to bear children, instead of wasting their time on woman suffrage, this city and society would be better off." Supporters in the courtroom and outside broke into protest. The judge's statement intensified interest in the case and redefined the issue as a dispute about women's roles rather than about obscenity as was previously viewed through the anti birth control propaganda of Anthony Comstock.  The trial and following protests set a new tone for public debate about birth control.

Another outcome of the trial was that it inspired Margaret Sanger to return to the United States and stand trial herself.

The couple divorced in 1921.

References

1870s births
1975 deaths
Physicians from Virginia
20th-century German Jews
Jewish architects
German emigrants to the United States